Franklin Hall may refer to:

Places
Franklin Hall (Columbus, Mississippi), a Mississippi Landmark
Franklin Hall (Goodwell, Oklahoma), listed on the NRHP in Oklahoma
Franklin Hall, San Francisco, 1906 San Francisco earthquake Committee's final venue

People
Franklin P. Hall (born 1938), U.S. politician
Franklin Hall (comics) a supervillain
Franklin Hall (minister) (1907-1993), an American minister

Organizations
Franklin Hall was the nickname of Theta Xi's chapter at Yale University -

Architectural disambiguation pages